The Khorshidi dynasty, Abbasi dynasty or Shahs of Little Lorestan (1184–1597) was a Lur dynasty that ruled Little Lorestan in the later Middle Ages from their capital Khorramabad.

They were neighbours of the Hazaraspids who ruled over Greater Lorestan. While the Hazaraspids were more politically important because of their vast territory and the fact that they held major communications routes, the Khorsidi dynasty would become a significant power during the Safavid era due to the end of the Hazaraspids. The Khorsidi dynasty remained an important player in the rivalry between the Safavids and the Ottomans.

History 
The Khorsidi dynasty came from the Lur Jangardi tribe and bore the name "Khorshidi" after their first ruler. Their territory included Khorrambad and territory formerly held by the Annazids until they diminished. In the 12th century, Shoja al-Din Khorshid ibn Ali took the title Atabak and became and independent ruler after the death of his suzerain. He then received the district of Ṭarazak in Khuzestan from Caliph Al-Nasir of the Abbasid Caliphate for some coins, before he died circa 1224. He was succeeded by his nephew Sayf al-dīn Rostam who took power forcefully and became a competent ruler. He was subsequently succeeded by Šaraf al-dīn Abū Bakr, ʿEzz-al-dīn Garšāsp and Ḥosām-al-dīn Ḵalīl. The latter was killed in a family feud. Caliph al-Nasir refused to recognize the brother of Ḥosām-al-dīn Ḵalī, Badr-al-dīn Masʿūd, as the new leader who thus approached and obtained Mongol support.

Masʿūd maintained his position and received a share of the booty from the Siege of Baghdad in 1258. He died in 1260. A succession struggle took place with Tāǰ-al-dīn Šāh b. Ḵalīl being installed as the new ruler of the Khorsidi dynasty. Nothing is known about his tenure but he was killed in 1278/79 on the order of the Ilkhanate. The land was afterwards divided between two sons of Badr-al-dīn Masʿūd who both managed to advance their territory from Hamadan to Shushtar, and from Isfahan to Arab-populated areas. In 1293, Gaykhatu deposed both sons and installed Jamāl-al-dīn Ḵeżr, son of Tāǰ-al-dīn Šāh b. Ḵalīl.

Tāǰ-al-dīn Šāh b. Ḵalīl died in 1294 and was succeeded by Ḥosām-al-dīn ʿOmar who quickly had to cede power to Ṣamṣām-al-dīn Maḥmūd who was executed by Ghazan in 1296 for taking part in the murder of Ḵeżr. The land was subsequently ruled by ʿEzz-al-dīn Aḥmad Ḥosayn under the guardianship of his cousin Badr-al-dīn Masʿūd. The land was divided between the two but ʿEzz-al-dīn gained all of the land and reigned until the late 1310s. He was followed by his widower Dawlat Ḵātūn who gave the land to his brother ʿEzz-al-dīn II Maḥmūd and thus creating a new line of princes. ʿEzz-al-dīn II Maḥmūd reigned until 1329/1330 and was followed by his son Šoǰāʿ-al-dīn Moḥammad who died between 1349 and 1369.

Timur of the Timurid Empire invaded the territory in 1386 on the pretext of the dynasty overtaxing the population and he completely destroyed the capital Khorramabad and devastated Borujerd. At the time of the invasion, land was ruled by ʿEzz-al-dīn III who was banished to Turkestan before being allowed to return for three years. He was able to escape after Timur invaded for a second time in 1392/93 and he was killed in 1403/04. His son Sīdī Aḥmad was able to recover the domain after the death of Timur in 1405 and he ruled the territory until 1412/1413. He would be followed by his brother Shah Ḥosayn who ruled until his death around 1466 and 1469.

His son Shah Rostam Abbasi and grandson Mir Ughur ibn Shah Rostam rallied to the Safavids but not much information exist from this period of the history of the dynasty. The ruler of the dynasty was Moḥammadī when Shah Ismail II died and he had recognized the suzerainty of the Ottoman Empire before renewing his loyalty to the Safavids. Shah Abbas I went on to marry the daughter of the contemporary ruler of the Khorsidi dynasty Shahverdi Abbasi. When approached by the Shah, Shahverdi Abbasi led to Baghdad, was reinstated in 1594/95, became subordinate again and ultimately executed in 1597/98, thereby ending the Khorsidi dynasty. Subsequent walis of Lorestan would trace their origins to the dynasty.

References

Sources 
 
 
 
 
 
 
 

History of Lorestan Province
History of Khuzestan Province
History of Hamadan Province
History of Isfahan Province
States and territories disestablished in 1597